Alfred Ireland Harland (26 November 1897–1968) was an Irish footballer who played in the Football League for Everton.

References

1897 births
1968 deaths
Association football forwards
English Football League players
Pre-1950 IFA international footballers
Association footballers from Northern Ireland
Linfield F.C. players
Everton F.C. players
Runcorn F.C. Halton players